Tom McCamus (born July 25, 1955) is a Canadian film and theatre actor. He is most widely known for his works on the television show Mutant X and drama film Room.

Life and career
McCamus was born in Winnipeg, Manitoba, Canada, and was brought up in London, Ontario from the age of ten, after his family moved cross country. While attending London's Oakridge Secondary School, McCamus became intrigued with the theatre, and went on to attend the University of Windsor's school of dramatic art.

His film debut came in director Paul Donovan's quirky time-travel comedy Norman's Awesome Experience, otherwise known as A Switch in Time (1989). In 1991 McCamus gained critical acclaim for his role as a mental patient in the historical drama Beautiful Dreamers.

McCamus' role as struggling actor Henry Adler in I Love a Man in Uniform (1993), directed by David Wellington resulted in him winning the Genie Award for Best Actor. McCamus has been nominated for the Genie Award on two occasions since, for Long Day's Journey into Night (1996), also directed by Wellington, in which McCamus reprised his successful performance as Edmund Tyrone from the Stratford Festival, and for the Oscar-nominated The Sweet Hereafter (1997), directed by Atom Egoyan.

McCamus came to the attention of a wider audience playing the villainous Mason Eckhart in the Marvel TV series Mutant X. Although McCamus proved sufficiently popular that he appeared in every episode of the first season, something that was not originally planned, he quit the show to star as Richard III and Mack the Knife at the Stratford Festival. He only returned to Mutant X to make occasional appearances in the second and third seasons.

McCamus starred in the CBC film Waking Up Walter: The Walter Gretzky Story (2005) as famous hockey dad Walter Gretzky, the Canadian production Shake Hands with the Devil (2007), and in the Ken Finkleman miniseries At the Hotel (2006).

In 2010 he appeared at Stratford as Captain Hook in Peter Pan and as Valmont in Dangerous Liaisons.

He appeared in the 2019 season of CBC's Street Legal in a supporting role.

McCamus is married to theatre and occasional TV actress Chick Reid. They live in Warkworth, Ontario.

Filmography

References

External links 
 

1955 births
Living people
Canadian male film actors
Canadian male television actors
Canadian male voice actors
Male actors from London, Ontario
Male actors from Winnipeg
University of Windsor alumni
Dora Mavor Moore Award winners
Best Actor Genie and Canadian Screen Award winners
Canadian male Shakespearean actors
20th-century Canadian male actors
21st-century Canadian male actors